Term of Duck Village may refer to:
 Duck Village, square in Somerville, Massachusetts
 Duck Village, tourist attraction in Malta